Satinder Satti is an Indian television anchor, actress, poet, dancer, singer, and  former Punjab Arts Council chairperson. She has won accolades for her performances as a popular television host. The platform is non-profit and launched to spread experiences and ideas among people in Punjab.

Career
Satinder Satti did her graduation from RR Bawa DAV College, Batala and then master's degree in law from Guru Nanak Dev University, Amritsar. Starting as anchor at Guru Nanak Dev University Youth Festivals Satinder Satti went on to anchor shows on Doordarshan, Alpha Punjabi, E.T.C. and PTC channels. Satinder Satti has also performed many shows and events to raise funds for needy people in Punjab. She has two music albums to her credit Moh and Peeng. Satti released an anthology of poetry Anjammiya Both (unborn child), a collection of poems. Her book was launched by Punjabi poet Surjit Patar.

Poems
Kuch khat tere naam

Anchor
Kujh Pal Tere Naam
Excuse Me Please
Lishkara
Caught On Camera
Dil Diyan Gallan
Chaa Da Cup with Satinder Satti

Filmography
Lal Chudiyan
Saanjh Dilaan Di
Jee Ayan Nu (2002)
Myself Pendu (2015)

Discography

References

External links
 
Official website

Indian women classical singers
Living people
Punjabi-language singers
Guru Nanak Dev University alumni
Bhangra (music) musicians
21st-century Indian singers
21st-century Indian women singers
1972 births